Dinkar Balu Patil (13 January 1926 – 24 June 2013) was an Indian politician and Member of Parliament. He was a senior member of the Peasants and Workers Party of India.

Early life and education
Patil was born on January 13, 1926, in Jasai Village, Uran. He studied art and law, practicing the latter from 1951 to 1956 before being elected to the Maharashtra Legislative Assembly in 1957.

Social and political activism 
 
Patil focused on aiding the farmers of Uran Taluk in Raigad District, Maharashtra. He was sentenced to one year's imprisonment in 1958 for participation in the satyagraha on the issue of border disputes between the states of Maharashtra and Karnataka. He also took part in the movement for formation of the Samyukta Maharashtra. He became a member of the Central Secretariat of Peasants and Workers Party in 1957 and was appointed its general secretary in January 1983.

Navi Mumbai was set up in 1970 on CIDCO farmer's land. But Mr. Patil brought all the farmers together in their fields and gave them fair rates for their farm lands. In 1984, 5 farmers died in the agitation but in the end, they succeeded. And provided 12.50% land for project-affected people and CIDCO allotted 40 sq. ft. Meter land per lease farmers and other workers. This brought justice to the farmers and other workers in Navi Mumbai. 

In 1990, he played a pivotal role in maintaining peace in Maharashtra.
He is 5 times MLA,1 time MLC,2 times MP,One time Kulaba local board member and one time City President in his political career.

References

Maharashtra MLAs 2004–2009
Peasants and Workers Party of India politicians
Lok Sabha members from Maharashtra
Marathi politicians
India MPs 1977–1979
India MPs 1984–1989
People from Raigad district
1926 births
2013 deaths